Bearing Straight is the title of the debut album of Canadian guitarist Don Ross, released in 1989.

Track listing
All songs written and arranged by Don Ross.
 "The First Ride" 3:42
 "Catherine" 5:57
 "Midnight March" 5:30
 "Silversmith" 6:20
 "That'll Be the Phone" 3:42
 "Patmos" 6:57
 "The Is-Ought Controversy" 3:34
 "Goby Fish" 3:10
 "King Street Suite" 4:11
 "Ginger and Fred" 3:27
 "In From the Cold" 5:42
 "New Aaron" 7:09
 "Slow Burn" 5:51

Personnel
Don Ross – acoustic guitars
David Piltch - acoustic bass on track 2
Hugh Marsh - violin on track 2

References

Don Ross (guitarist) albums
1989 debut albums
Duke Street Records albums